Wildlife smuggling or trafficking involves the illegal gathering, transportation, and distribution of animals and their derivatives. This can be done either internationally or domestically.  "Wildlife smuggling is estimated at $7.8bn to $10bn a year, according to the U.S. State Department. The U.S. State Department also lists wildlife trafficking as the third most valuable illicit commerce in the world." The illegal nature of such activities makes determining the amount of money involved incredibly difficult. When considered with illegal timber and fisheries, wildlife trafficking is a major illegal trade along with narcotics, human trafficking, and counterfeit products.

Products demanded by the trade include exotic pets, food, traditional medicine, clothing, and jewelry made from animals' tusks, fins, skins, shells, horns, and internal organs. Smuggled wildlife is an increasing global demand; it is estimated that the US, China, and the European Union are the places with the highest demand.

Culture
At the core of the illegal wildlife trafficking is a strong and rapidly expanding demand for a variety of products around the world: bushmeat; ingredients for traditional Chinese medicine; exotic pets; jewelry, trinkets, and accessories such as chess sets; furs for uses ranging from coats to traditional costumes; and trophies. With the exception of bushmeat, which is used as a primary source of protein by some cultures, all of these uses of illegally obtained wildlife are trophies, driven by a desire to be seen as more affluent, adventurous, or successful than others.

In many parts of Africa, the main demand for illegal wildlife comes from the consumption of bushmeat. Wild animals are a preferred as a source of protein and primates are considered a delicacy. It is believed that up to 40,000 monkeys are killed and eventually consumed each year in Africa alone via smuggling. Many primates are killed by bushmeat hunters, who supply to markets all over Africa, Europe, and the United States.

Much of demand for rhinoceros horns, tiger bones, and other animal products arises out of the practice of traditional Chinese medicine, which uses these ingredients to treat fevers, gout, and other illnesses;   maintain good health and longevity; and enhance sexual potency. Traditional Chinese medicines are taken by hundreds of millions of people. For example, some practitioners drink an expensive liquid made from tiger bones to improve their circulation, treat arthritis, and strengthen the body, in general.  The sale of tiger bones and products made from them is an example of the confusion that can exist on the topic. The sale of bones was outlawed in China in 1993; however, a pilot program, established in 2005, allows the use of bones for captive-bred tigers.  This can create a confusion in the minds of buyers as to whether the bones were legally obtained. Regardless, tiger wine cannot be sold legally in China, although advertisements for it ran on state television channel in 2011 and journalist attended an auction where tiger wine was offered for sale. Many of the traditional Chinese medicines fail to cure anything, although the demand for them continues to expand greatly and to the detriment of wildlife.

But the most trafficked animal in the world is the pangolin. Pangolins are the only scaly mammal on earth. In the last decade, more than one million pangolins were poached and killed for their scales. Although there are no proven medical values, their scales are used in traditional Chinese medicine and considered a privilege for the wealthy in China and Vietnam.

Exotic pets are animals desired by consumers due to their rarity or simply they are not easily available in the owner's region. Television shows and movies can make certain animals popular.  While many of these animals can be obtained from legal sources, many animals are captured from their endemic environments, smuggled across national and International borders, and wind up in family homes, menageries, or roadside circuses. Reptiles, such as bearded dragons and geckos, and birds, such as scarlet macaws and certain falcons, make up the largest share of animals captured and sold. Exotic mammals including three-toed sloths, sugar gliders, prairie dogs, hedgehogs, monkeys and other animals are kept as pets. "Birds are the most common contraband; the State Department estimates that two million to five million wild birds, from hummingbirds to parrots to harpy eagles, are traded illegally worldwide every year." Tigers are a popular pet. An estimated 5,000 to 7,000 tigers (2013) are kept in the United States. The range of numbers is due, in part, to the lack of required reporting in some areas. For comparison, less than 400 of these big cats are in U.S. zoos accredited by the Association of Zoos and Aquariums and 3,200 live in the wild. Tropical fish, nonhuman primates, and other animals are also part of the exotic pet trade. The U.S. has very strong natural animal and plant laws. Ivory is the most difficult object to bring in the US.. You cannot buy pearls out of state and bring them in. Most of the countries that have animal laws use the template of CITES. If any animal has outside animal parts coming in, the US will not import it.

Ineffective monitoring of international wildlife trade
The volume of international trade in wildlife commodities is immense and continue to rise. According to an analysis to the 2012 Harmonized System customs statistics, global import of wildlife products amounted to US$187 billion, of which fisheries commodities accounted for $113 billion; plants and forestries for $71 billion; non-fishery animal for $3 billion.

However, the global trade of wildlife commodities is ineffectively monitored and accounted for due to the constraint of the current HS Code System used by the customs worldwide. Majority of international imports of wildlife are only recorded in general categories such as plant or animal products with no further taxonomic detail (this is like importing metals without recording their element identity e.g. copper or iron). It is estimated that near 50% of the global import of plant and 70% of animals product are imported as general categories, with an exception for fisheries (ca. 5%) thanks to various multilateral fishery management agreements that requires taxon-specific fish catch reporting. Furthermore, some frequently traded taxonomic groups including amphibian and live coral are not accounted for at all due to the absence of HS code.

Many jurisdictions relies on the declared HS Code of the consignments for detection and prosecution of illegal wildlife import. The lack of specificity of HS code precludes effective monitoring and traceability of global wildlife trade. There is an increasing call for a reform of the Harmonized System to strengthen monitoring and enforcement of global wildlife trade.

Impact

Economic
Members of terrorist organizations and criminal organizations illicitly traffic in hundreds of millions of plants and animals to fund the purchase of weapons, finance civil conflicts, and launder money from illicit sources. These often transnational efforts require a funding and a network of poachers, processors, smugglers, sellers, and buyers. Well armed, highly organized poaching activities, such as the murderous 2012 attacks in Chad and the Republic of Congo, have captured headlines. The appeal, in part, is the low risk of detection and punishment compared to drug trafficking. In addition, trafficking can reap significant profits for those leading such efforts. For example, a single Ploughshare tortoise from Madagascar (there are only 400 estimated left in the wild) can fetch US$24,000.

Elephant ivory, a commonly trafficked contraband, can sell for little in the source country and can fetch high prices in destination countries. Prices depend greatly on the source country and the product. Ivory prices and demand have skyrocketed, making it a growing and very lucrative market. Globally, The illegal ivory trade activity in 2014 has more than doubled what it was in 2007. China is the largest importer of illegal ivory; the United States is second."According to reports from wildlife organization Save the Elephants, the price for raw ivory in China was $2,100 per kilogram." Between 2010 and 2012, up to 33,000 elephants were poached and killed on average each year. Wildlife smuggling presents an economic cost to the countries where it occurs, including lost tourism and development opportunities.

Health
The spread of animal-borne disease affects both human health as well as threatening indigenous wildlife and natural ecosystems. According to the United States Government Accountability Office, nearly 75% of emerging diseases that reach humans come from animals. The link between wildlife trafficking and disease outbreak is questioned, although outbreaks of certain diseases have suspected links to smuggled animals.

Diseases believe to have originated and spread by wildlife smuggling
SARS (severe acute respiratory syndrome) is caused by a virus and infects both humans and wildlife. Experts suspect that the SARS virus originated in the China due to contact between a civets (wildcats common in Chinese trade) and humans.
Avian flu (H5N1) is caused by a highly pathogenic virus. It can infect humans through contact with infected crested hawks and other wild birds, but can be transmitted by contact with poultry as well.
Monkeypox is an infectious disease found in Africa's wildlife that can spread to humans.
Ebola Virus is a rare infectious disease that is transmitted from wild animals (chimpanzees, monkeys, gorillas, fruit bats, etc.) to human populations. The transmission of the virus usually occurs through consuming the infected animals, close quarters, or bodily liquid contact.

Diseases linked to animal species that are targets of wildlife smuggling
Herpes B virus is a virus found among macaque monkeys that can be transmitted by bites or scratches to humans in extremely rare cases. If not treated soon after exposure, severe brain damage or death can follow infection.
Salmonella infection can cause diarrhea, fever, and abdominal cramps. Infections have been linked to contact with turtles, bearded dragons and other reptiles.

Environmental
Wildlife smuggling directly affects the biodiversity of different ecosystems. Certain animals are in higher demand by smugglers, leading to a visible decline of these species in their native habitats. Wildlife smuggling may also cause the introduction of invasive and harmful species into an ecosystem, which can endanger indigenous wildlife by putting a strain on the environment's resources through interspecific competition between species. Throughout the last hundred years, around twenty animals are extinct due to poaching and illegal smuggling, such as the West African black Rhinoceros,  Pyrenean Ibex, Passenger Pigeon... Unfortunately, poaching and illicit hunting may cause extinction for new 7 species like Ploughshare Tortoise, Red-Fronted Macaw...

International control measures
Increasingly interconnected globalization increases international trade in a wide variety of products, extending even to exotic animal products. Traders and consumers who still participate in the international exotic animal market ignore the detrimental effects of depleting our environment and ecosystem and instead give priority to individual consumer benefits, such as monetary gains or high fashion. Some people and groups have realized these choices cannot be sustained or tolerated.

Many species are not protected until they are endangered, this delay in protection results in significant losses of biodiversity in the ecosystem. Legislation, such as the Endangered Species Act (ESA), serves to regulate human environmental intervention on the international scale to protect and preserve “species of fish, wildlife, and plants (that) have been so depleted in numbers that they are in danger of or threatened with extinction” and their habitats and to hold those in violation of it accountable. As the international community increases efforts in monitoring and controlling environmental damage, the United Nations aims to create more protected habitats and ecosystems through initiative like the Sustainable Development Goal 15.

Wildlife trafficking is a rising international crisis that is not only taking away animal rights but also threatening the world on global environmental, social, and economic levels. It's contributing to an illegal economy and having detrimental effects on humans’ well-being. The Endangered Species Act (ESA) works along with international treaties like Convention on Migratory Species (CMS) and Convention on International Trade in Endangered Species of Wild Fauna and Flora (CITES), aiming to combat transnational crimes and make joint efforts for wildlife protection. The penalties as a result of breaking these laws are fines as small as $500 per violation and as large as $25,000 per violation or imprisonment up to 6 months. These laws are weakened by these limited penalties and extensive exceptions. These exceptions include “scientific purposes or to enhance the propagation or survival of the affected species…, undue economic hardships…, and  Pre-Act endangered species parts exemption; application and certification; regulation; validity of sales contract; separability; renewal of exemption; expiration of renewal certification.”

Coalition Against Wildlife Trafficking
The Coalition Against Wildlife Trafficking (CAWT) was established in 2005 by the U.S. State Department as a voluntary coalition of governments and organizations that aims to end the illegal trade of wildlife and wildlife products. CAWT currently includes six governments and thirteen international NGOs. Their means of action include raising public awareness to curb demand, strengthening international cross-border law enforcement to limit supply, and endeavoring to mobilize political support from upper echelons.

Association of Southeast Asian Nations Wild Enforcement Network
The Freeland Foundation and TRAFFIC Southeast Asia worked with the Thai government and the Association of Southeast Asian Nations (ASEAN), to establish the ASEAN Wildlife Enforcement Network (ASEAN-WEN) in 2005. ASEAN-WEN oversees cross-border cooperation and aims to strengthen the collective law enforcement capacity of the ten ASEAN member countries. It is the largest regional wildlife law enforcement collaboration in the world and receives support from the United States Agency for International Development.

South Asian Enforcement Network
The South Asian Enforcement Network (SAWEN) was created with the help of CAWT and TRAFFIC. In 2008, South Asian environment ministers agreed to create SAWEN under the support of the South Asia Co-operative Environment Programme. The SAWEN countries include Afghanistan, Bangladesh, Bhutan, India, Maldives, Nepal, Pakistan and Sri Lanka.

Convention on International Trade in Endangered Species
The Convention on International Trade in Endangered Species of Wild Fauna and Flora (CITES) directs its efforts at the supply side of wildlife smuggling. It aims to end wildlife smuggling and to ensure that international trade does not threaten endangered species. For example, Vicuna, the smallest member of the camelid family, was endangered because it was massively hunted for its wool. But after the Vicunas were under the protection of CITES, their numbers increased to reach 350,000 by 2008.

By country

Australia
International trade of Australia's wildlife is regulated under Part 13A of the Environment Protection and Biodiversity Conservation Act 1999. The same act implements provisions of CITES and the UN Biodiversity Convention in relation to imports of threatened biodiversity and wildlife.

Ecuador
Latin America is vulnerable to wildlife smuggling because of its biodiversity. Ecuador is known for its biodiversity. In northern Ecuador, the Yasuní National Park and the surrounding Waorani Ethnic Reserve, which cover about 1,770 square miles, are home to around 4,000 species of plants; numerous animals, including the giant river otter; more than 400 fish species; and more than 500 species of birds. As a comparison, the United States is home to 900 species of birds. Commonly smuggled birds include the scarlet macaw; this colorful bird, with bright red, brilliant blue, yellow, and white feathers, is in high demand as a pet. Animals stolen in Latin America often end up in Europe, the United States, or Japan. Though there are laws against wildlife smuggling, the lack of resources causes conservation to be low in priority.

Mexico
China has become involved in wildlife trafficking, another aspect of its illegal activities in Mexico that include involvement in drug trafficking and other organized crime.

See also
CITES – Convention on International Trade in Endangered Species
Environmental crime
IUCN Red List –  International Union for the Conservation of Nature, list of threatened species
Poaching
Wildlife conservation
Wildlife management
Wildlife farming
Wildlife smuggling hubs in Asia
Wildlife trade
Wildlife smuggling in southern Africa
Endangered species

Notes

References

External links

ASEAN-WEN official website
FREELAND Foundation official website
Environmental Investigation Agency (EIA) official website
USA branch of EIA
TRAFFIC official website

Pangolins

 
Wildlife law
Environmental crime
Organized crime activity